Mithu Alur (born 27 March 1943 and usually referred to as Dr. Mithu Alur) is the founder chairperson of The Spastic Society of India – now rechristened ADAPT – Able Disable All People Together. She is an educator, disability rights activist, researcher, writer and published author on issues concerning people with disability in India.

Alur is a pioneer in the care and education of people with Neuro-Muscular and Developmental Disabilities, like cerebral palsy, autism, Down syndrome and intellectual disabilities.

Early life and education

Alur was born and raised in Kolkata. She did her higher education in Delhi in Miranda House. She acquired a bachelor's degree in English literature from the University of Delhi in 1963. In 1965, she married Ranjit Chib. A year later Malini Chib was born.

Malini was diagnosed with cerebral palsy. Finding that no proper school for children with disabilities exited in India, in 1968 she trained as a teacher in the field of special education at the Institute of Education (IOE), University of London.

Spastics Society of India

Back home in India, she wanted to open a school in Mumbai, and contacted the then Prime Minister of India, Indira Gandhi. Gandhi asked her to get in touch with actress Nargis Dutt. Dutt became the first patron of The Spastics Society of India (SSI), which formally started on 2 October 1972.

Alur later set up the first-ever special school in India for children with cerebral palsy, "Centre for Special education", at Colaba on 2 October 1973, providing education and treatment facilities under one roof. It began with just three children – Malini Chib, Farhan Contractor and Imtiaz. Nargis Dutt remained its lifelong patron. After her death in 1981, her mantle was taken up by her husband, Sunil Dutt.

The Spastics Society has since broadened its scope to include programs on teacher training, vocational training of young adults with cerebral palsy, autism, intellectual disabilities, multiple disabilities and learning disabilities. It also works in the field of advocacy and awareness and offers support to parents and other professionals.

In 1999, Alur established the National Resource Centre for Inclusion (NRCI), in Mumbai, to integrate disabled children from special schools into normal schools. The Spastics Society of India has since changed names and is currently called ADAPT – Able Disable All People Together. Many of the state level spastics societies under the aegis of The Spastics Society of India have also since changed names.

Academic career

Alur's research work has been instrumental in guiding government policy for people with disability. Her 1998 PhD thesis "Invisible Children – A Study of Policy Exclusion", also published as a book in 2003, examined the Government of India's policy for the disabled. It followed the evolution of educational policy in India for disabled children with specific reference to the Government of India's pre-school programme called the Integrated Child Development Services (ICDS). Her research found massive exclusion of children and people with disabilities from services and even from Government programmes targeted at the vulnerable and weaker sections of society to the extent of nutrition being denied to children with disabilities. Her finding that over 90% people with disabilities, or around 70 million people, are excluded from services of any kind provided the seminal statistics for those working in the disability sector to push for better care of people with disabilities.

Media
Alur's writings, feature articles, opinion pieces, columns and research paper for books, have appeared in many national and international newspapers, magazines, portals etc. including The Times of India, The Indian Express, and The Statesman. She has also regularly appeared on different news channels, specifically NDTV, advocating the right of people with disabilities.

Books 
 Education and Children with Special needs – from segregation to integration, with Seamus Hegarty, Published by Sage Publications, new Delhi, 2002.
 Invisible Children – A Study of Policy Exclusion, Viva Books Private Limited, New Delhi, 2003.
 Inclusive Education – The Proceedings of North South Dialogue I (with Professor Tony Booth).
 Inclusive Education – From Rhetoric to Reality, The North South Dialogue II with Dr. Michael Bach.
 The Journey for Inclusive Education in the Indian Sub-Continent, with Michael Back Published by Routledge, New York, USA, 2009.
 Inclusive Education Across Cultures: Crossing Boundaries, Sharing Ideas, co-edited with Vianne Timmons, Published by Sage, 2009.

Current work

For the last ten years, Alur has been involved with inclusive education and implementing Education for All (EFA) for all children who are not within the purview of mainstream education. She has been working in the slums of Mumbai and has recently finished a longitudinal research with UNICEF where she has created an Education For All model for 'all' children who are disadvantaged including the girl child, the disabled child and children in poverty, demonstrating that inclusive education can happen anywhere including the poorest places. This has been based on work in the Dharavi slums of Mumbai covering a population of 30,000, working with 6,000 families and with community teachers who were trained to teach 'all' children. Today over 3,000 children have been put into municipal schools. Fourteen nurseries have been specially set up for all children within this population, both with and without disabilities. Models for intervention strategies at the family and community levels have been designed.

Alur, along with husband Sathi Alur, is also currently involved in the Shiksha Sankalp project, an action based research project under the aegis of ADAPT and co-funded by BMZ (Federal Ministry for Economic Cooperation and Development), Germany and CBM (Christian Blind Mission) that aims to "formulate a protocol or blueprint for screening children out of school—especially the disabled ones—and to create a database which would help the (Indian) government to formulate curriculum according to the special needs".

Alur started the Mithu Alur Foundation intending to create an inclusive village model in Maharashtra. The foundation aims to do so with schools, hospitals, medical services and livelihood through skills training programmes, and women's empowerment. 

She has been a vocal activist against the exclusion of people with disabilities and has written articles, books and papers propagating inclusion in society. Talking about the exclusion of children of disabilities under the Right of Children to Free and Compulsory Education Act RTE Act from schools, she said:

Alur has advocated inclusive education under the news provisions in the Right of Children to Free and Compulsory Education Act RTE Act, stating that it will help every child, including children without disabilities.

Awards and honours

 1989: Padma Shri Award
 2003: Martha Forrest Rose Quartz Warrior Award
 2006:Paul Harris Fellow Award; Rotary International, USA.
 2009: EMPI – Indian Express Indian Innovation Award.
 2009: Woman of the Year Award for Outstanding Woman Citizen of Mumbai; Indian Merchant Chamber.
 2010: Woman of the Year – CNN IBN Super Idol Award.

References

External links
 The National Resource Centre for Inclusion - The Spastics Society of India, Official website
 The Spastics Society of India Detailed Profile
 Mithu Alur's Profile on NDTV

1943 births
Living people
Indian disability rights activists
Recipients of the Padma Shri in social work
People from Kolkata
Alumni of the UCL Institute of Education
Social workers
20th-century Indian women
20th-century Indian educators
Women educators from West Bengal
Educators from West Bengal
Social workers from West Bengal
20th-century women educators